Psycho III is a 1986 American slasher film, and the third film in the Psycho franchise. It stars Anthony Perkins, who also directs the film, reprising the role of Norman Bates. It co-stars Diana Scarwid, Jeff Fahey, and Roberta Maxwell. The screenplay is written by Charles Edward Pogue. The original electronic music score is composed and performed by Carter Burwell in one of his earliest projects. Psycho III is unrelated to Robert Bloch's third Psycho novel, Psycho House, which was released in 1990.

The film takes place one month after the events of Psycho II where Norman Bates is still running the Bates Motel with the corpse of Emma Spool still sitting up in the house. A suicidal nun, with whom Norman falls in love, comes to the motel along with a drifter named Duane Duke. A reporter also tries to solve the mysterious disappearance of Mrs. Spool as someone begins another murder spree.

Released on July 2, 1986, Psycho III grossed $14.4 million at the U.S. box office on a budget of $8.4 million, becoming the lowest-grossing film in the series. It received mixed reviews from critics and was followed by a television prequel, Psycho IV: The Beginning.

Plot
In 1982, Norman Bates works at the Bates Motel and lives with the preserved corpse of Emma Spool, a waitress who told him she was his real mother. When Spool remains missing after a month, Norman's ex-boss, Ralph Statler, and local law enforcement grow concerned. Duane Duke, a sleazy musician desperate for money, is offered the job of assistant manager at the motel. Tracy Venable, a journalist from Los Angeles, is working on an article about serial killers being released from custody. Believing that Norman is killing again, Tracy appears at the diner where he works and attempts to talk with him. Norman opens up to her but is distracted when Maureen Coyle, a young, mentally unstable former nun, enters. Maureen resembles his former victim, Marion Crane. Seeing the initials "M.C." on her suitcase, Norman panics and leaves the diner.

"Mother" enters Maureen's bathroom that night, intending to kill her, only to find that she has cut her wrists. The shock of this causes Norman to reassert his personality while a delirious Maureen mistakes "Mother" holding a knife for the Virgin Mary holding a crucifix. Norman brings Maureen to a hospital and offers that she stay as long as she needs to. After she is released, they begin a romantic relationship. That night, Duke picks up a girl named Red at a bar, but after Red makes it clear that she wants more than a fling, Duke rejects her. Red tries calling a cab, but "Mother" shatters the phone booth door and stabs Red to death. The following day, tourists arrive at the motel, planning to watch a football game. Tracy searches Spool's apartment, discovering the motel's phone number written on a magazine cover repeatedly.

Patsy Boyle, the motel's only sober guest, is murdered by "Mother". Norman finds her body and buries her in the motel's ice chest. The next morning, Sheriff Hunt and Deputy Leo appear to investigate Patsy's disappearance. Tracy tells Maureen about Norman's past, causing Maureen to stay with Father Brian, who took care of her at the hospital. Norman finds that Spool's corpse is missing and finds a note stating that she is in Cabin 12. Duke extorts Norman, threatening to turn him into the police for murder unless he is given a large sum of money. In an ensuing fight, Norman beats Duke with his guitar until he loses consciousness. Norman drives his car to the swamp with Duke and Patsy's bodies inside. Duke regains consciousness and attacks Norman, who accidentally drives into the swamp. Norman escapes the car while Duke drowns.

Tracy talks to Statler about Spool and discovers she was working at the diner before Statler purchased it from Harvey Leach. Tracy meets with Leach, a resident at an assisted living facility, and is informed that Spool was also institutionalized for murder. Maureen convinces herself that Norman is her true love and returns to the motel. They share a tender moment at the top of the staircase when "Mother" shouts furiously at Norman, startling him. He loses his grip on Maureen's hands, causing her to fall down the stairs, killing her. Enraged, Norman promises "Mother" that he will get her for this. Tracy enters the house and finds Maureen dead, then sees Norman dressed as "Mother" bearing a knife, but is unable to flee.

Tracy tries reasoning with Norman by explaining his family history: Emma Spool was his aunt and was in love with Norman's father, but he married her sister, Norma. Spool killed Norman's father and kidnapped Norman when he was a child, believing he was the child "she should have had with him". When she was caught, Norman was returned to Norma while Spool was institutionalized. Tracy discovers Spool's corpse in the bedroom. Norman takes off his dress. "Mother" orders him to kill Tracy, but when Norman raises the knife, he attacks "Mother" instead, dismembering Spool's corpse. Sheriff Hunt takes Norman to his squad car. Hunt informs Norman that he'll never get out of the institution again, to which Norman replies: "But I'll be free...I'll finally be free". In the back of the squad car, Norman caresses the severed hand of Emma Spool.

Cast

Music

Carter Burwell was approached by Perkins to compose the score to the film, since Perkins had enjoyed Burwell's work on Blood Simple. Perkins stated that he wanted to take the score in a more contemporary direction than Jerry Goldsmith had for his more traditional score for Psycho II. Burwell flew to Los Angeles and recorded the score largely on a Synclavier electronic music station, augmented by women's and boys' choirs as well as percussion by Steve Forman.

After Universal suggested the film contain some pop songs so that the film could be marketable to the MTV generation, Burwell composed and performed songs with colleagues Stanton Miranda and Steve Bray. After Universal claimed the songs weren't sufficiently bankable, Burwell attempted to create a song with Oingo Boingo frontman and then burgeoning film composer Danny Elfman, using sampled strings from Bernard Herrmann's score to the original Psycho. This idea was also rejected.

Universal finally agreed to let Burwell take a motif from the score he'd composed and develop it into an instrumental electronic pop song. The song, "Scream of Love"—co-written by jazz saxophonist David Sanborn—was released as a 7" single and a series of dance remixes were commissioned from Arthur Baker and featured on the 12" version. MCA also commissioned a music video for the song featuring Burwell, Perkins and a "Hitchcockian woman". Perkins introduced the video on MTV as a guest VJ on July 2, 1986. The rest of the songs composed by Burwell, Miranda and Bray were used as background music in the film, playing from car stereos and jukeboxes.

Burwell's score was sampled by the hip hop group Insane Poetry on "Welcome to the Grim Side", the intro to their 1992 debut album Grim Reality, as well as on British musician Aim's 1999 electronica album, Cold Water Music.

Release
When the film opened on July 2, 1986, it earned $3.2 million in its opening weekend and went on to gross $14.4 million at the domestic box office, becoming the lowest-grossing theatrical film of the Psycho series.

Critical response
Reviews from critics were mixed. Vincent Canby of The New York Times wrote a generally positive review, calling Perkins a "very creditable director" and Pogue's screenplay "efficient", concluding that "Psycho III expresses its appreciation of the Hitchcock legacy without seeming to rip it off". Variety wrote that the film "has its moments—about 20 minutes' worth—but the rest is filler in which the filmmakers gamely but futilely try to breathe new life into a tired body". Michael Wilmington of the Los Angeles Times thought that the film was "better in most respects than 'II'", but "it fails any sequel's acid test. It feeds off the original without deepening it". He added that "if the movie proves anything, it's that everyone should give Hitchcock a rest". Paul Attanasio of The Washington Post called it "a playful, artfully made horror movie" made "really fun" by "Perkins and Pogue's morbid humor, the way they've captured the Hitchcock spirit and made it their own". Tom Milne of The Monthly Film Bulletin wrote that Perkins gave "an excellent performance" but "there isn't very much more to be said about Norman Bates".
 
Gene Siskel and Roger Ebert were split on the film's effectiveness. On their television show At the Movies, Ebert gave the film a "thumbs up" positive appraisal, saying it was a "much better movie than part two", and adding, "in his first directing effort, Perkins shows that he knows Norman better than anyone else". Siskel, however, gave the film a "thumbs down" negative rating, reasoning that he was "turned off by some of the violence" and that the film "just sort of laid there".

As of September 2022, the film holds a 59% approval rating based on 32 reviews on the review aggregator Rotten Tomatoes, with an average rating of 5.5/10. The site's consensus states: "While it can't come close to the original's elemental horror, Psycho III makes a persuasive -- and blackly funny -- case for itself as a sequel".

Home media
Psycho III has been released four times on DVD. The initial release came in 1999 when Universal Studios leased the film out to GoodTimes Home Video. The second release came in 2005 from Universal Studios itself. The third release came in 2007 as part of a triple feature package with Psycho II and Psycho IV: The Beginning. Shout Factory released a special edition on DVD and Blu-ray in September 2013.

References

External links

1986 films
1986 horror films
1980s mystery films
1980s slasher films
1980s psychological thriller films
American mystery films
American sequel films
American serial killer films
American slasher films
American thriller films
1980s English-language films
Matricide in fiction
Films directed by Anthony Perkins
Psycho (franchise) films
Films set in 1982
American psychological horror films
Universal Pictures films
Films scored by Carter Burwell
1986 directorial debut films
1986 soundtrack albums
Films with screenplays by Charles Edward Pogue
1980s American films